Danum Platform is a mesa-like rock eminence  northeast of Haven Mountain, forming the divide between Bibra Valley and Dubris Valley in the Britannia Range. It was named in association with Britannia by a University of Waikato geological party, 1978–79, led by Michael Selby; Danum is a historical name used in Roman Britain for present-day Doncaster.

External links 

 Danum Platform on USGS website
 Danum Platform on AADC website
 Danum Platform on SCAR website
 Satellite image of the Danum Platform
 Danum Platform area map

References 

Rock formations of Oates Land